Shit is an English-language vulgarism, literally referring to feces, but having many metaphoric uses.

Shit or The shit may also refer to:

Places
Shit, Kermanshah, a village in Kermanshah Province, Iran, also known as Shit-e Kamarzard 
Shit, Mazandaran, a village in Mazandaran Province, Iran
Shit, Zanjan, a village in Zanjan Province, Iran

Music
"Shit" (song), the third single from the album Honest by American rapper Future
"Scheiße" (song), song from the album Born This Way by American singer Lady Gaga
The Shit (album), unreleased studio album by hip hop duo 2nd II None
"The Shit" (song), song on 2003 album Deuce by The D.O.C.
 "Shit", a 2021 song by Bo Burnham from the special Bo Burnham: Inside

See also
 
 
 
 Oh Shit (disambiguation)